The following is a list of hydroelectric power stations in Sweden with a nameplate capacity > 100 MW.

The electricity production from Swedish hydroelectric power stations cover around 45% of the Swedish electricity consumption.

Hydroelectric power stations

See also 

 List of power stations in Sweden
 Wind power in Sweden
 Biofuel in Sweden
 Renewable energy in Sweden
 Renewable energy by country

External links

References 

 
Dams in Sweden
Sweden